Hexaplex saharicus is a species of sea snail, a marine gastropod mollusk in the family Muricidae, the murex snails or rock snails.

Suvspecies
 Hexaplex saharicus ryalli Houart, 1993

Description

Distribution
This species occurs in the Atlantic Ocean off Southern Morocco and Ivory Coast.

References

 Houart, R., 1993. Description of three new species and one new subspecies of Muricidae (Muricinae and Muricopsinae) from west Africa. Bollettino Malacologico 29(1–4): 17–30

External links
 Locard, A. (1897–1898). Expéditions scientifiques du Travailleur et du Talisman pendant les années 1880, 1881, 1882 et 1883. Mollusques testacés. Paris, Masson. vol. 1 [1897], p. 1–516 pl. 1-22; vol. 2 [1898], p. 1–515, pl. 1-18.
 MNHN, Paris: syntype

Muricidae
Gastropods described in 1897